The Responsible Investment Brand Index (RIBI) is a scale to evaluate the global asset management industry on its ability to demonstrate its commitment to sustainable investment into their respective brands. The annual index was created in 2018 by Jean-Francois Hirschel and Markus Kramer.

Methodology 
The RIBI universe is based on the global asset managers listed in Investment & Pensions Europe IPE 500 ranking and analyses over 300 publicly available data points. The Index evaluates asset managers on two key dimensions: the Commitment rating, focusing on hard factors (e.g. the level and quality of listed equity voting), and the Brand rating, evaluating soft factors (e.g. the existence of a Purpose statement and the quality of the latter). Each of these two ratings ranges from 0 (poor) to 5 (excellent).

Commitment Rating 
The evaluation is calculated based on publicly available information listed in the Principles for Responsible Investment Transparency Report.

Brand Rating 
The evaluation is calculated based on publicly available information on a firm's brand and includes the assessment of whether or not an asset manager expresses a purpose, whether or not the latter connects with societal goals, the evaluation of the quality of the expression of the purpose based on key criteria, whether or not the asset manager has a value system, whether or not this value system connects with societal goals, an evaluation of the quality of the expression of the values system based on five criteria and whether or not the asset manager has a strapline which connects with societal ambitions.

Categories 
The consistency of what an asset manager commits to in terms of Responsible Investment and how the firm projects this in its brand is categorized into four main quadrants. Avant-Gardists (above average on commitment rating and brand rating), Traditionalists (above average on commitment rating and below average on brand rating, Aspirants (above average on brand rating and below average on commitment rating) and Laggards (below average on both ratings).

The Avant-Gardist category is published in full to encourage positive behaviour within the industry. Firms in this category regularly use and reference the index in their brand communication.

Results 
As per the index's third edition, the number of asset managers linking their core purpose to societal goals has nearly doubled. However, only a few companies appear to convey their commitment to Responsible Investment through their brand. Only a fifth (19%) of asset managers fall into the Avant-Gardist category and demonstrate above-average ratings on both the Commitment and Brand dimensions. Whilst regulation and client demand for Environmental, social and corporate governance related investments continue to rise, the ability of asset managers to integrate their good intentions into their brands lags behind.

Geographical location is found to have a major impact on how well asset managers rank in the index. There are significantly more French groups among the best-practice companies than in other countries. Also, above-average ranked are companies based in the Benelux. Asset managers based in Germany and Southern Europe are under-represented within the more advanced categories.

As of 2021, the index examines regional differences. European asset managers rate above the global average. The Asia Pacific and North American regions rank below the global average.

Significance 
The index contributes to a critical and healthy debate on how well the asset management industry is achieving this in regards to its ability to express good intention through a firm's identity, e.g. its brand.

References

Indexes
Publications established in 2018
Publications